Serhan Zengin (born 11 April 1990) is a German-Turkish former footballer who played as a midfielder. He is the coach of the under-19 team of TuS Komet Arsten.

Career
Zengin made his professional debut for Werder Bremen II in the 3. Liga on 25 July 2009, starting in the home match against Rot-Weiß Erfurt, which finished as a 0–0 draw.

References

External links
 
 
 FC Oberneuland 2011–12 statistics at Fussball.de

1990 births
Living people
German people of Turkish descent
German footballers
Turkish footballers
Footballers from Bremen
Association football midfielders
3. Liga players
Regionalliga players
SV Werder Bremen II players
FC St. Pauli II players
FC Oberneuland players
SV Wilhelmshaven players
VfB Oldenburg players
BSV Schwarz-Weiß Rehden players
German football managers